This is list of notable Iraqi physicians.
 Abd al-Latif al-Baghdadi
 Ahmed Shaker, endocrinologist, killed in Iraq after leaving his clinic in 2013
 Ala Bashir, plastic surgeon
 Hashim Al-Witry, Iraqi physician
 Imad Sarsam, orthopaedic surgeon
 Mohammed A.F. Al-Rawi, respiratory consultant, killed in Iraq 2003
 Omar Fakhri, Iraqi medical scientist
 Raad Shakir, Professor of Neurology at Imperial College London
 Saib Shawkat
 Salim Haim (1919–1983), dermatologist

References 

 
Lists of Iraqi people by occupation